Laurel Heights is a census-designated place (CDP) in Cumberland County, New Jersey, United States. It is bordered to the west by the community of Sunset Lake.

Laurel Heights was first listed as a CDP prior to the 2020 census.

Demographics

References 

Census-designated places in Cumberland County, New Jersey
Census-designated places in New Jersey
Upper Deerfield Township, New Jersey